Christof Loy (born 5 December 1962) is a German stage director especially for opera, whose work received several awards. A freelance director, he has staged operas from Baroque to premieres of new works at major European opera houses and festivals. He is known for directing works by Mozart.

Career 
Born in Essen, the son of architect  and a translator, Loy began studies of opera directing at the Folkwangschule with Dieter Bülter-Marell at the age of 14. He received the Folkwang-Preis award for his first staged work, Pimpinone. He studied in Essen until 1982 and continued his studies at the Munich University, including science of the theatre, art history, and Italian studies. In 1986, he moved to the Staatstheater Wiesbaden, and since 1990 he has worked as a freelance director.

He made his debut at the Royal Opera House in 2002 with Ariadne auf Naxos, conducted by Antonio Pappano who was then the new music director. He also staged there Donizetti's Lucia di Lammermoor, Alban Berg's Lulu and Wagner's Tristan und Isolde. He directed Mussorgski's Khovanshchina at the Dutch National Opera, Handel's Alcina and Bellini's I Capuleti e i Montecchi at the Opernhaus Zürich, Verdi's Macbeth at the Grand Théâtre de Genève, Britten's Peter Grimes at the Theater an der Wien, Janáček's Jenůfa at the Deutsche Oper Berlin, Der Rosenkavalier by Richard Strauss at the Royal Swedish Opera, Mozart's Così fan tutte and Don Giovanni, and Arabella by Richard Strauss at the Oper Frankfurt, his Daphne at the Theater Basel, and Handel's Theodora for the Salzburg Festival. In 2017, he directed the premiere of Andrea Lorenzo Scartazzini's Edward II. at the Deutsche Oper Berlin.

Among other awards, his staging of Mozart's Così fan tutte at the Oper Frankfurt earned him the prize Der Faust in the category direction in music theatre (Regie Musiktheater) in 2008.

Opera productions 
 Claudio Monteverdi
 L'Orfeo (2001 Düsseldorf)
 Il ritorno d'Ulisse in patria (2003 Düsseldorf)
 L'incoronazione di Poppea (2004 Deutsche Oper am Rhein)

 G. F. Handel
 Alcina (2002 Hamburg, 2014 Opernhaus Zürich)
 Saul (2003 Bavarian State Opera)
 Giulio Cesare (Theater an der Wien)
 Theodora (Salzburg Festival).

 Christoph Willibald Gluck
 Iphigénie en Aulide (Glyndebourne Festival)

 Joseph Haydn
 Armida (2007 Salzburg Festival)

 W. A. Mozart
 La finta semplice (2006 Oper Frankfurt)
 La finta giardiniera (1998 Düsseldorf)
 Lucio Silla (Copenhagen Opera)
 Die Entführung aus dem Serail (1992 Freiburg, 1999 Brüssel, 2003 Frankfurt)
 Le nozze di Figaro (1998 Brussels)
 Don Giovanni (1999 Graz Opera, 2014 Frankfurt)
 Così fan tutte (2008 Frankfurt)
 Die Zauberflöte (1990 Stuttgart, 2004 Deutsche Oper am Rhein)
 La clemenza di Tito (2006 Frankfurt)

 Vincenzo Bellini
 I Capuleti e i Montecchi (Opernhaus Zürich)
 La straniera (Opernhaus Zürich)

 Gioachino Rossini
 Il turco in Italia (2005 Hamburg)
 L'italiana in Algeri (2001 Deutsche Oper am Rhein)
 La donna del lago (2010 Grand Théâtre de Genève)

 Gaetano Donizetti
 Lucia di Lammermoor (1999 Düsseldorf, Royal Opera House)
 Roberto Devereux (2004 Munich)
 Lucrezia Borgia (2010 Munich)

 Hector Berlioz
 La damnation de Faust (2000 Bremen)
 Les Troyens (2005 Deutsche Oper am Rhein)

 Richard Wagner
 Tannhäuser (1995 Musiktheater im Revier, Gelsenkirchen)(2019 Dutch National Opera)
 Tristan und Isolde (Royal Opera House)
 Parsifal (Royal Swedish Opera)

 Engelbert Humperdinck
 Königskinder (2022 Dutch National Opera)

 Giuseppe Verdi
 Macbeth (Grand Théâtre de Genève)
 Les vêpres siciliennes (Dutch National Opera)
 Don Carlos (2000 Duisburg)
 Falstaff (Deutsche Oper Berlin)

 Jacques Offenbach
 La belle Hélène (2005 Deutsche Oper am Rhein)
 Les contes d'Hoffmann (2004 Deutsche Oper am Rhein)

 Charles Gounod
 Faust (2005 Frankfurt)

 Peter Tchaikovky
 Eugen Onegin (2001 La Monnaie)

 Modest Mussorgski
 Khovanshchina (Dutch National Opera)

 Jules Massenet
 Werther (1996 Bremen)
 Manon (1997 Düsseldorf)

 Giacomo Puccini
 La bohème (2002 Brussels)
 La fanciulla del West (Royal Swedish Opera)

 Pietro Mascagni / Ruggero Leoncavallo
 Cavalleria rusticana und Pagliacci (2003 Düsseldorf)

 Leoš Janáček
 Její pastorkyňa (Jenůfa) (2012 Deutsche Oper Berlin)

 Richard Strauss
 Der Rosenkavalier (2001 Brussels, Royal Swedish Opera)
 Ariadne auf Naxos (2002 Royal Opera House)
 Arabella (Dutch National Opera)
 Die Frau ohne Schatten (2011 Salzburg Festival)
 Intermezzo (2009 Theater an der Wien)
 Daphne (Theater Basel(

 Franz Lehár
 Die lustige Witwe (1992 Ulm)

 Benjamin Britten
 Peter Grimes (2015 Theater an der Wien, International Opera Awards 2016) 

 Alban Berg
 Lulu (Royal Opera House)

 Hans Werner Henze
 Der Prinz von Homburg (2009 Theater an der Wien)
 Die Bassariden (Munich)

 Andrea Lorenzo Scartazzini (* 1971) 
 Der Sandmann (2012 Theater Basel)
 Edward II. (2017 Deutsche Oper Berlin)

Awards 
 1982: Folkwang-Preis
 2001: Duisburger Musikpreis
 2003: Nomination Laurence Olivier Award
 2003: Director of the Year (Regisseur des Jahres) by Opernwelt
 2004: Director of the Year
 2008: Director of the Year
 2008: Der Faust for Così fan tutte at the Oper Frankfurt
 2017: International Opera Awards as best opera director

References

External links 
 
 Christof Loy Operabase
 
 International Opera Award für Christof Loy Deutsche Welle

German theatre directors
German opera directors
1962 births
Living people
Folkwang University of the Arts alumni
Ludwig Maximilian University of Munich alumni
People from Essen